Empicoris is a cosmopolitan genus of thread-legged bug (Emesinae). Numerous species have been described.

Species
These 18 species belong to the genus Empicoris:

References

Reduviidae